Avion is a commune in the Pas-de-Calais department in the Hauts-de-France region of France.

Geography

Population

Sights
 * The church of St. Eloi, rebuilt, as was most of the village, after the First World War.
 The modern church of St. Denis.
 The war memorial.
 The nearby Commonwealth War Graves Commission cemetery.
 The nearby Canadian National Vimy Memorial

International relations

Avion is twinned with:
 Doncaster, England, since May 1981.
 Erzgebirge, Germany since 1961.
 Zgorzelec, Poland since 1987.
 Zagorje ob Savi, Slovenia since 1961.

Photographs

See also
Communes of the Pas-de-Calais department

References

External links

 Official website 
 Website of the Communaupole de Lens-Liévin 
 Website about Avion and the Palestinians 
 Ch'ti Parc adventure playground website 
 The CWGC graves in the commune cemetery

Communes of Pas-de-Calais
Artois